Vlastimil Vidlička (born 2 July 1981) is a Czech football defender currently playing for SK Sigma Olomouc in the Czech Republic.

References
 
 
 Guardian Football

Czech footballers
Czech Republic youth international footballers
Czech Republic under-21 international footballers
Czech First League players
AC Sparta Prague players
FK Teplice players
FC Fastav Zlín players
FC Slovan Liberec players
SK Sigma Olomouc players
Wisła Kraków players
1981 births
Living people
Expatriate footballers in Poland
Czech expatriate sportspeople in Poland
Association football fullbacks
Sportspeople from Zlín